is a Japanese politician serving her first term in Japan's House of Councillors, having been elected in July 2010 as a candidate for the Liberal Democratic Party (LDP). She previously represented the Shizuoka 7th district in the House of Representatives for one term from 2005 until 2009.

Early life and career
Katayama was born in Urawa, Saitama Prefecture (later Urawa-ku, Saitama). After graduation with a Bachelor of Laws degree from the University of Tokyo, where she was chosen Miss Tokyo University (Miss Tōdai), Katayama found employment in the Ministry of Finance (MoF) as a secretary for Finance Minister Michio Watanabe. During her time at the MoF, Satsuki Katayama graduated from ENA in France.

Political career

She was elected to the House of Representatives for the first time in the 2005 general election and served as Deputy Minister of Economy, Trade and Industry. She was one of 83 so-called "Koizumi Children," LDP candidates elected for the first time amid the widespread popularity of reformist prime minister Junichiro Koizumi; Koizumi touted Katayama as a "madonna of reform."

Katayama and 72 other "Koizumi Children" were defeated in the 2009 general election, in which the Democratic Party of Japan routed the LDP. Following the 2009 election, Katayama commented that "the past four years have been a fight against the symbols of Koizumi's reforms, and we have proved they were wrong." She later characterized herself as a "war-displaced orphan" in 2011.

On 1 May 2019, she attended the presentation of the Three Sacred Treasures to Emperor Naruhito. In the last such ceremony in 1989, only males were allowed to be in attendance; however in 2019 all cabinet members were allowed to attend regardless of sex, although only male adults from the imperial family could attend.

Katayama, like many of her LDP colleagues, is affiliated with the ultra-conservative Nippon Kaigi. She also has strong anti-Korean sentiment and has attended meetings of the far-right, xenophobic Zaitokukai, an extremist organization that seeks to eliminate supposed privileges to Zanichi Koreans.

Personal life 
She married international politics professor Yōichi Masuzoe in 1986 while working at the MoF. They separated after several months, divorced in 1989 and are both remarried. Masuzoe later became a prominent media personality and member of the House of Councillors, and both Masuzoe and Katayama were considered by the LDP as candidates for the 2014 gubernatorial election in Tokyo. Prime Minister of Japan Shinzō Abe, who led the LDP to endorse Masuzoe in his successful election, said that he wanted Katayama more than anyone else to stand in support of Masuzoe, but Katayama responded that it was difficult for her to do so given Masuzoe's publicized dispute over support payments to one of his extramarital children, who is disabled. Katayama and Masuzoe both studied at ENA, France.

In 1990, she married Ryutaro Katayama, a Japanese businessman who is an alumnus of Harvard Business School.

References

External links 
  

1959 births
Living people
People from Saitama (city)
University of Tokyo alumni
Koizumi Children
Female members of the House of Representatives (Japan)
Members of the House of Representatives (Japan)
Liberal Democratic Party (Japan) politicians
Anti-Korean sentiment in Japan
21st-century Japanese women politicians